Kharjah may refer to:

 Kharja, a medieval poetry genre in Spain and Portugal, also called markaz
 Abu Kharjah, a place near Kirkuk in Iraq
Al Kharjah, Iraq a place near Samarra in Iraq
 Al Kharjah, Saudi Arabia, longitude 40.7189 east, latitude 21.0828 north
 Shab Umm Khargah, a place in Arabia, described by Richard Francis Burton in The Land of Midian